Thomas Ludwig Herbst (27 July 1848, in Hamburg – 19 January 1915, in Hamburg) was a German Impressionist painter; known mostly for landscapes and animal portraits.

Biography 
He took his first lessons in 1865 with Jakob Becker at the Städelsches Kunstinstitut in Frankfurt. The following year, he transferred to the Prussian Academy of Arts in Berlin, where he worked with Carl Steffeck. In 1868, he transferred again, this time to the Weimar Saxon Grand Ducal Art School, where he took advanced studies with Charles Verlat.

From 1873 to 1876, he lived in Düsseldorf and took several trips to the Netherlands. He then spent a year in Paris with his friend, Max Liebermann, before moving to Munich, where he came into contact with the Munich Secession and Wilhelm Leibl.

In 1884, he returned to Hamburg and became a drawing teacher at the "Vocational School for Women". More training followed in 1890, with the landscape painter, Carl Rodeck. In 1897, he became one of the founding members of the  but, according to Arthur Siebelist, resigned in 1903 because he did not like their "cultural standards".

In 1906, he went on an extended study trip to Holstein with Friedrich Ahlers-Hestermann. In later years, he acquired the nickname "Kuhherbst" (Kuh means Cow), in reference to one of his favorite subjects.

In 2015, on the centennial of his death, the Jenisch House in Hamburg held a major retrospective of his works.

References

Further reading 
 Carsten Meyer-Tönnesmann: Der Hamburgische Künstlerclub von 1897. Atelier im Bauernhaus, Fischerhude 1997, . 
 Hans-Jörg Czech, Carsten Meyer-Tönnesmann, Nicole Tiedemann-Bischop (Eds.): Thomas Herbst. 1848–1915. Liebermanns Freund, Lichtwarks Hoffnung. (exhibition catalog, Hamburg Historical Museum Foundation), Atelier im Bauernhaus, 2015

External links 

 
 ArtNet: More works by Herbst.

1848 births
1915 deaths
Artists from Hamburg
19th-century German painters
19th-century German male artists
German male painters
20th-century German painters
20th-century German male artists
German Impressionist painters
Prussian Academy of Arts alumni